The Big D and Bubba Show is a nationally syndicated radio show airing six days a week on approximately 80 country music FM radio stations.

The show is syndicated by Compass Media Networks.  Live shows are broadcast from 6 to 10 AM (Eastern Time) Monday through Friday.

There is also a pre-show heard weekday mornings from 5 to 6 AM (EST), and a 4-hour "best of" show called "The Big D & Bubba Weekend Wakeup" which is heard on Saturday or Sunday mornings on most broadcast affiliates.

The Big D & Bubba show is broadcast globally in over 177 countries through the American Forces Network (AFN). The show is available on all United States military installations, as well as all ships at sea.

You can also listen to a live stream of the show on the "Big D & Bubba APP" which is available on iPhone & Android devices.

"The Big D & Bubba Weekly Podcast" is a popular Comedy, Entertainment, & Lifestyle focused podcast centered around the lives of the members of the show, their families, and friends.

Big D (Derek Haskins) is married with two sons and spent time as an exchange student in Russia.  He is originally from Cookeville, Tennessee.  Big D  is a married father of two, and a licensed airplane pilot .

Bubba (Sean Powell) grew up in Houma, Louisiana, and like Big D, also started on the radio at age 14.  He has spent time working for radio stations around the country, and the island of Guam.  Bubba is married with three children and is also a licensed pilot.

History

Big D and Bubba first teamed up on December 16, 1996, on WXCT (now WTGE) in Baton Rouge, Louisiana.  The show gained enough success to garner the attention of cross-town country rival WYNK-FM.  In February 1999, Big D and Bubba signed a deal with AMFM Broadcasting (then owner of WYNK) to do mornings on the station and have the ability to syndicate the show nationally.  No country morning show had ever been successful in a nationally syndicated format for an extended period of time.  Soon after their debut on WYNK, AMFM Broadcasting was purchased by Clear Channel Communications, a forerunner to iHeartMedia, Inc.

In August 1999, Big D and Bubba hired Patrick Thomas to produce their morning show.  He was brought on board in anticipation of future syndication opportunities and is still with the show to this day. Patrick's involvement with the show has evolved over the years, and he oversees day-to-day operation of Silverfish Media, the parent company of Big D & Bubba.

On December 6, 1999, Big D and Bubba were first heard on KMML-FM in Amarillo, Texas.  This marked the beginning of syndication.

The show grew slowly but steadily while fighting the widely held belief that a syndicated country morning show simply would not work.  By the summer of 2003, the Big D and Bubba Show was heard on 14 radio stations (more than any other country morning show).

In the fall of 2003, Clear Channel Communications relocated Big D and Bubba to Nashville, Tennessee and based their show on radio station WSIX in order to be at the center of the country music format.

In September 2005, Big D and Bubba signed a syndication deal with Premiere Radio Networks.

On November 22, 2011, Big D & Bubba ended their broadcast on WSIX to concentrate on their syndication. This move set plans in motion for their eventual departure from the corporate radio world, and fulfilling a dream to become their own bosses.

In September 2013, Big D and Bubba announced that they were leaving Premiere Networks to form their own production company called Silverfish Media.  They signed a partnership deal with Compass Media Networks to distribute the show, sell advertising, and license the show to affiliates.

In January 2016, "Carsen" became the show's first female cast member. She remains with the show today, and is currently the Director of Programming for all of Silverfish Media's properties.

The Big D & Bubba show is now heard on nearly 100 radio stations around the United States.

On Monday, October 18, 2021, Big D & Bubba made their return to the Nashville airwaves as WKDF became the new home station for the show. The show previously aired in Nashville on rival station WSIX-FM from 2003 to 2011.

Awards and recognition

The Big D and Bubba show was the first morning show to win the CMA and/or ACM for National Broadcast Personalities of the Year.

 2007, 2014 Academy of Country Music "National Personalities of the Year" 
 2015 Country Music Association "National Personalities of the Year"

In April 2015, Big D, Bubba, and Patrick were named the Academy of Country Music's National On-Air Personalities of the Year (awarded for 2014). This was their second award in that category.  
They were also nominated in 2010, 2016, and 2020.

In November 2015, Big D, Bubba, and Patrick were named the Country Music Association National Broadcast Personalities of the Year. 
They were also nominated for the CMA Awards in 2002, 2007, 2011, 2014, and 2017.

References

External links
 Official Website
 Official Facebook page
 Official Twitter
 YouTube profile

American comedy radio programs
Radio programs on XM Satellite Radio